Rajapur is a locality/township of Allahabad, Uttar Pradesh, India.

Rajapur is a very old locality of Allahabad. Its residents are of various religions. The Late Jang Bahadur Patel advocate and Member of Parliament was from there.

Rajapur is crowded due to an influx of villagers. Presently the town has more than 40,000 inhabitants and is rapidly increasing, straining the infrastructure. 

Neighbourhoods in Allahabad